Kołysanki (Polish for "Lullabies") is the fifth studio album by Polish band Lux Occulta. The album was released on March 13, 2014. It is the first album released by the band in 13 years, as well as the first since the ending of the band's hiatus, making it the longest gap between the band's albums.

Sound
Kołysanki marks a drastic departure of the band's previous black metal sound in favor of a more experimental electronic rock sound. A reviewer for the webzine Metal Storm described the album's opening track, "Dymy", as having a "heavy synth atmosphere, with very groovy beats and rhythms and vocals that dance between charismatic singing and interesting spoken word." He also praised the song "Samuel wraca do domu" for its "use of sax, double bass, and organ, that sounds more like a jazz piece from the early 1900s than anything else", as well as the song "Karawanem Fiat" for taking a "neoclassical approach with acoustic guitar work that would delight even the most seasoned of flamenco listeners." Thomas Bawden of Axis of Metal described the album as a "musical mindfuck", which feature "track titles in Polish and then prominently featuring electronically sampled French vocal lines", "violin melodies that could almost be described as neo-classical if they weren’t so dissonant, frequently set to a bombastic industrial backing beat", and "psychedelic guitar lines meandering back and forth amidst a nightmarish flurry of almost gypsy folk-inspired accordion lines", as well as jazz melodies that "lend the piece the atmosphere of a 1930s smoke-filled club."

Track listing
All lyrics written by Jarosław Szubrycht. All music composed by Jerzy Głód, except "Karawanem Fiat" composed by Jerzy Głód, Grzegorz Kapłon, and Piotr Szczurek.

Personnel 
Lux Occulta
Jarosław Szubrycht – lead vocals, lyrical concept, visual concept
Jerzy Głód – keyboards, backing vocals, musical concept, mixing, production
Wacław Kiełtyka – lead guitar, accordion
Maciek Tomczyk – rhythm guitar, acoustic guitar

Additional musicians
Julia Doszna – vocals
Julie Cazalas – vocals
Catherine Fornal – vocals
Łukasz Madej – double bass
Wojtek Krzak – violin
Władysław Grochot – trumpet
Tomasz Grochot – cajón
Marek Tomczyk – classical guitar, mixing, mastering

Production
Elżbieta Biryło – cover art
Łukasz Jaszak – graphic design
Igor Szubrycht – writing

References 

2014 albums
Lux Occulta albums
Polish-language albums
French-language albums